Jean Marie River (Slavey language: Tthek'éhdélį or Tthek'edeli  "water flowing over clay") is a "Designated Authority" in the Dehcho Region of the Northwest Territories, Canada. The community is located on the Jean Marie River where it joins the Mackenzie River. The community has a small airport, Jean Marie River Airport, and is accessible by charter aircraft throughout the year and by the all-season JMR Access Road  from the Mackenzie Highway.

Demographics

In 2016, the majority of its population was First Nations. The main languages in the community are Dene Zhatie (South Slavey) and English.

Services
Royal Canadian Mounted Police services are provided through Fort Simpson. There is neither a hospital nor a health centre but a health station, the "Jean Marie Health Cabin", located in Jean Marie River. There is currently no grocery store, but there are accommodations and a visitors centre. Education is provided through the Louie Norwegian School and provides education up to Grade 10.

First Nations
The Dene of the community are represented by the Jean Marie River First Nation and belong to the Dehcho First Nations.

Mackenzie River Flooding 
On May 7 2021, the Mackenzie River flooded, damaging 22 of the community's 26 homes and its only school, disabling the only power plant servicing the community, and causing significant diesel spills. Rebuilding had begun by the 9th of June; residents raised objections to the slowness of the authorities' approach, and a lack of guidance in relation to oil spills which had left many homes smelling strongly of diesel.

Gallery

References

External links

 Official site

Communities in the Dehcho Region
Dene communities